A Defense of the Constitutions of Government of the United States of America is a three volume work by John Adams published in 1787–1788. The work was written while Adams was serving as the American ambassador in London. In Britain and in previous postings in France and the Netherlands Adams had confronted several criticisms of the government systems used by the American states. Adams started the work prior to the writing of the Constitution of the United States and the work is not a defense of that document, but rather of the various state constitutions that were in place in 1787.

The most prominent critic Adams confronted was Anne Robert Jacques Turgot. Turgot's works were read as criticizing the separation of powers found in the state constitutions. Turgot reject the idea of bicameral legislatures and governors with executive powers, arguing that the best republic was one with a single legislature with all powers and responsibilities. Turgot had died in 1781, but posthumously his ideas had been adopted by other European liberals including Richard Price and the comte de Mirabeau. Beyond Europe, Adams believed there were many supporters in the United States for this idea.

Turgot argued that the American system was simply a republican gloss over the structures inherited from Britain, a senate replacing the House of Lords and president replacing the king. The bulk of Adam's three volume book is describing various republics from across history to argue that the American system is designed to take the best parts of all of them. The republics covered include those of Europe in Adams time, the Netherlands, the city states of northern Italy, and he has discussions of each of the Swiss cantons and their diverse republican systems. He also looks at what he calls the monarchical republics of Britain and Poland, and the classical republics in Greece and Rome.

References

John Adams
1787 non-fiction books
1788 non-fiction books
Documents of the American Revolution
Political history of Massachusetts
State constitutions of the United States
Books about politics of the United States